The Kau is a river in Mizoram, northeastern India.

References

Rivers of Mizoram
Rivers of India